The Buccaneer 220 is an American trailerable sailboat, designed by Gary Mull and first built in 1978. The design is now out of production.

Production
The boat was built by Buccaneer Yachts/US Yachts, a division of Bayliner, which is itself a division of the Brunswick Boat Group, which is in turn owned by the Brunswick Corporation.

The design was later developed into the US Yachts US 22.

Design
The Buccaneer 220 is a small recreational keelboat, built predominantly of fiberglass, with wood trim. It has a fractional sloop rig, a transom hung rudder, a shoal-draft fin keel and may be fitted with a spinnaker for downwind sailing.

The Buccaneer 220 has a PHRF racing average handicap of 237 with a high of 258 and low of 228.

See also
List of sailing boat types

Similar sailboats
Alberg 22
Cape Dory 22
Core Sound 20 Mark 3
CS 22
DS-22
Edel 665
Flicka 20
Hunter 20
Nonsuch 22
Pearson Electra
Santana 22
Starwind 223
Tanzer 22

References

Keelboats
1970s sailboat type designs
Sailing yachts
Trailer sailers
Sailboat type designs by Gary Mull
Sailboat types built by Buccaneer Yachts